The Forschungsflugkörper (German for research aircraft) was a sounding rocket manufactured by ERNO from 1972 to 1974 for the DLR. It was a single stage rocket that consisted of 1xFFK. Germany was the country that developed and tested this spacecraft. It had 3 launches, two of which were failures. It was a fairly small craft with a weight of 300 kg, a length of 4.00 metres, a core diameter of 0.25 metres, and apogee of 120 km.

Chronology
1972 October 10–14:00 GMT -  Launch Site: Biscarosse.  Launch Vehicle: Forschungsflugkörper.  LV Configuration: Forschungsflugkörper 1. FAILURE: Failure.
DLR C-FFK-45 Test mission Nation: Germany.  Agency: DLR.

1972 October 24 -  15:00 GMT -  Launch Site: Biscarosse.  Launch Vehicle: Forschungsflugkörper.  LV Configuration: Forschungsflugkörper 2. FAILURE: Failure.
DLR C-FFK-46 Test mission Nation: Germany.  Agency: DLR.

1974 May 7–13:00 GMT -  Launch Site: Biscarosse.  Launch Vehicle: Forschungsflugkörper.  LV Configuration: Forschungsflugkörper 3.
DLR C-FFK-47 Test mission Nation: Germany.  Agency: DLR. Apogee: 120 km (70 mi).

Sources and further reading
Jonathan's Space Home Page, Harvard University, 1997–present. Jonathan McDowell's complete on-line listing of all objects orbited and over 20,000 rocket launches.
Encyclopedia Astronautica

Sounding rockets of Germany